Walter Lawrence Jr. (May 31, 1925 – November 9, 2021) was a surgical oncologist at Memorial-Sloan-Kettering Cancer Center, Cornell Medical College, and at the Medical College of Virginia. He was a leader in civil rights health equity efforts.

Early life and education 
Born on May 31, 1925, in Chicago, Illinois, Walter M. Lawrence Jr., was the son of Walter Lawrence, a primary care physician, and Violette (née Mathews) Lawrence. He attended Oak Park and River Forest High School and the University of Chicago, earning a Ph.B. in 1943, and an S.B. degree in 1945. He also attended Dartmouth College training and served in a non-combat role in the United States Navy during World War II from 1943 to 1946.

Lawrence wed Susan Grayson Shryock in Winchester County, Virginia, on June 20, 1947. He earned his M.D. at the University of Chicago, with his dissertation, Constrictive Pericarditis with Obstruction of Pulmonary Veins, in 1948. He had surgical training residencies at Johns Hopkins Hospital and Memorial Sloan-Kettering Cancer Center, then served in the U.S. Army Medical Corps in Korea as Chief of Surgery of a MASH hospital from 1952 to 1954.

Career 
From 1956 to 1996, Lawrence conducted both clinical and research activity at Memorial-Sloan-Kettering Cancer Center of Cornell Medical College.

Focus on issues of medical equity 
Robert Winn wrote, "The real mark Dr. Lawrence leaves behind is his mission to help those less fortunate than us and to ensure that some do not bear the burden of health and cancer burden. And he never rested on this mission. Until last year, he was using his platform to speak on behalf of the least heard voices, ensuring that everyone has access to affordable, world-class healthcare."

Harry D. Bear wrote, "...he may be the only person admitted to the membership of the Southern Surgical Society twice. He resigned from this group when they would not admit an African American candidate; he was later re-admitted to the Southern after that black candidate had achieved membership some years later. This is a typical example of his sense of what is right. That is just one area where he has been a valued source of advice over the years."

Academic positions 
In 1966, Lawrence became Vice-Chair of Surgery and Chair of the first academic Division of Surgical Oncology in the United States at the Medical College of Virginia. There he was also appointed Director of the NCI-accredited Massey Cancer Center, Medical College of Virginia, at the  Virginia Commonwealth University (VCU) campus from 1974 to 1990. He served on the VCU School of Medicine Admissions Committee where his primary focus was also on medical school teaching. Later, the teaching portion of his career consisted entirely of medical student teaching at Hunter Holmes McGuire Veterans Administration Medical Center.

Selected publications 
According to Bear, "Lawrence's bibliography includes more than 260 papers on a wide variety of topics, as well as half a dozen books, and 35 book chapters."

Books

Articles

Awards and honors 

 1944 Rufus Choate Scholar award from Dartmouth College
1964 Alfred P. Sloan Foundation Cancer Research award
 1971 American Cancer Society professorship of clinical oncology
 1988 University Award for Excellence from the Virginia Commonwealth University
1989 Massey Foundation: Walter Lawrence Jr. Distinguished Professorship in Oncology
1992 Virginia Cultural Laureate Award
1998 Beckstrand Cancer Foundation National Cancer Fighter of the Year, for "a lifetime of outstanding leadership and achievements in the war against cancer".
1999 President's Medal of the American Cancer Society
1999 Cancer Fighter of the Year Award from the Beckstrand Cancer Foundation
2000 Presidential Medallion from the Virginia Commonwealth University
2002 Lifetime Achievement in Science Award of the Science Museum of Virginia
2020 Honorary member of the American Society for Radiation Oncology

See also 

 List of surgeons

References

External links 
  (video, 28:41 minutes)
  (video, 15:06 minutes)
Phone Interview with Walter Lawrence Jr., MD, ASTRO 2020 Honorary Member

1925 births
2021 deaths
20th-century surgeons
21st-century surgeons
People from Chicago
Physicians from Illinois